The 2012–13 season was Leeds United F.C.'s third season back in the second tier of English football which saw a minor flirtation with play-offs and later with relegation, but ended with a mid-table finish. In other competitions, the squad recorded their best finish in the League Cup for 18 years, reaching the quarter-finals only to be knocked out by rivals Chelsea. Similar progression was seen in the FA Cup as the team reached the 5th round for the first time since the 1999–00 season.

The manager's office was vacated on 1 April by Neil Warnock after his promise of promotion appeared dead in the water, and the club actually on the fringes of the relegation battle. The club officials relieved him of his duties and after a brief period with caretaker manager Neil Redfearn in charge, appointed Brian McDermott as the club's eight manager in ten years. Pre-season saw a big change in the playing staff with no more than ten players departing Elland Road and twelve players brought in. New signing Lee Peltier became club captain after existing leader  Robert Snodgrass departed for Norwich City in the summer and was joined in the winter by fan favourite Luciano Becchio – both transfers much to the chagrin of the supporters. With Becchio gone, the club's top scorers were last year's star Ross McCormack with eight goals and controversial winger El Hadji Diouf with seven who Warnock picked up on a free transfer at the start of the season. Academy product Sam Byram would be the surprise of the season making his debut in the first game of the year and going on to scoop all the major awards at both the official, supporters' and Yorkshire Post's Player of the Year Awards. Other youngsters to take the field included Dominic Poleon who managed two goals and Chris Dawson who has since been awarded a three-year professional contract.

The talk of the season though was undoubtedly the protracted takeover of the club. The eight month, £52m takeover by Bahrain based GFH Capital saw the investment bank secure 100% shares of the club's parent company with four of its party joining the board of directors. In March, GFH would sell a 10% stake to the International Investment Bank and announced the company were looking for additional investors to boost the club's finances. The takeover would seemingly inject morale into the supporters with the club's short term finances secured and higher value incoming transfers promised. GFH deputy-CEO David Haigh become the public face for the boardroom with departing chairman Ken Bates taking a step back with a promise of the title club president secured for the end of the season.

Events
This is a list of the significant events to occur at the club during the 2012–13 season, presented in chronological order, starting on 29 April 2012 and ending on the final day of the club's final match in the 2012–13 season. This list does not include transfers or new contracts, which are listed in the transfers section below, or match results, which are in the matches section.

November
21 November: Middle East-based private equity group GFH Capital finalise a deal for a protracted takeover of Leeds.

December
21 December: GFH Capital officially become the new owners of Leeds after completing a takeover of the club.

January
24 January: Longest serving player and top goalscorer, Luciano Becchio, hands in a transfer request.

April
1 April: After a 1–2 home loss to Derby County, Manager Neil Warnock departs from Leeds United.
12 April: Leeds United appoint Brian McDermott as new manager.

May
4 May: Leeds United end the 2012–13 Championship season 13th, 7 points behind the playoffs and 7 points above the relegation zone.

Players

First team squad information

|-
|colspan="17"|Players who have been available for selection this season, but have now permanently left the club:

Appearances (starts and substitute appearances) and goals include those in the Championship (and playoffs), League One (and playoffs), FA Cup, League Cup and Football League Trophy.
1On loan at Ipswich Town
2On loan from SV Zulte Waregem
3Currently on loan at Inverness CT

Transfer-listed players

Appearances (starts and substitute appearances) and goals include those in the Championship (and playoffs), League One (and playoffs), FA Cup, League Cup and Football League Trophy.
1Player made fifty eight appearances (scoring six goals) for the club during his first spell at the club
2Player is currently on loan at Sheffield Wednesday
3Player is currently on loan at Preston North End
4Player is currently on loan at Accrington Stanley

Transfers

In

Out

New contracts

1The contract includes the option to extend the contract by a further year.
2Option to extend by further year taken up later in season.
3Contract extended by further year after making 30 appearances.

Pre-season

Competitions

Overall summary

Championship

Table

Results summary

Results by round

Championship

FA Cup

League Cup

Awards

Internal Awards

Official Player of the Year Awards

The results of the 2012–13 Leeds United A.F.C. Player of the Year Awards were announced at a dinner on 27 April 2013 at Elland Road.

Player of the Year:  Sam Byram
Young Player of the Year: Sam Byram
Players' Player of the Year: Sam Byram
Goal of the Season: Ross McCormack (vs Tottenham, 27 January)
Fastest Goal of the Season: Aidan White (vs Everton, 25 September)
Best Contribution to Community: Leigh Bromby
Chairman's Special Award: Tom Lees

References

External links

Official Website
Sky Sports
Soccerbase
ESPNsoccernet 

Leeds United F.C. seasons
Leeds United
Foot